Lawrence B. Glickman (born January 10, 1963) is an American history professor and author or editor of four books and several articles on consumerism. He has taught at Cornell University since 2014, where he is Stephen and Evalyn Milman Professor in American Studies. Previously he taught at the University of South Carolina. Glickman earned a Princeton University B.A. in history magna cum laude in 1985, a  M.A. in 1989 and his Ph.D. in 1992 both from University of California, Berkeley. He has written three books, A Living Wage: American Workers and the Making of Consumer Society, Buying Power: A History of Consumer Activism in America, and Free Enterprise: An American History.

References

21st-century American historians
American male non-fiction writers
Cornell University faculty
Cornell University Department of History faculty
Princeton University alumni
University of California, Berkeley alumni
Living people
1963 births
21st-century American male writers
New York (state) Democrats
Jewish American historians